Sarmaj-e Hoseynkhani (also Romanized as Sarmāj-e Ḩoseynkhānī; also known as Sarmāj) is a village in Shirez Rural District, Bisotun District, Harsin County, Kermanshah Province, Iran. At the 2006 census, its population was 1,289, in 310 families.

References 

Populated places in Harsin County